Michael George Stroka (May 9, 1938 in Passaic, New Jersey – April 14, 1997) was an American actor on soap operas including ABC-TV's Dark Shadows, in which he played Aristede, Bruno Hess, and Laszlo Ferrari from 1969 to 1970. In addition, he made a cameo appearance as a pallbearer in MGM's House of Dark Shadows (1970), the first of two feature films based on the series. He also appeared in 1965 on Combat! in two episodes, "Heritage" in season 3 and in "9 Place Vendee" in season 4.

Stroka was the son of Slovak immigrants, and was born in Passaic, New Jersey. Stroka was Byzantine Catholic, and a member of Saint Mary's Byzantine cathedral in Sherman Oaks.

From 1975 to 1976, he appeared as Dr. Quentin Henderson on The Edge of Night. He also guest-starred on Wonder Woman in the episode "The Deadly Dolphin" and in the Buck Rogers in the 25th Century episode "Journey to Oasis".

Michael Stroka died from kidney cancer in Los Angeles, California at age 58.

External links

1938 births
1997 deaths
Male actors from New Jersey
American male soap opera actors
American male television actors
Deaths from kidney cancer
People from Passaic, New Jersey
Deaths from cancer in California
20th-century American male actors
American people of Slovak descent